Jezernice is an uninhabited settlement in Croatia. In 1835, the village had 11 houses and 123 inhabitants.

References

Ghost towns in Croatia